This article lists orders and deliveries for the Airbus A220 family aircraft (formerly known as Bombardier CSeries), currently in production by Airbus Canada Limited Partnership, a joint venture between Airbus and the Government of Québec.

Sales

Bombardier CSeries

2016 
The effect of stiff competition and production delays was apparent in early 2016. On 20 January, United Continental Holdings ordered 40 Boeing 737-700s instead of the CSeries due to the availability of the 737 already in full production and potential savings for pilot training and spare parts logistics, as United had already flown 310 of the type. Boeing also reportedly gave United a massive 73% discount on the 737 deal, dropping the price to $22 million per aircraft, well below the CS300 market value at $36 million. David Tyerman, an analyst with Canaccord Genuity said to the Toronto Star: "This just shows how difficult it is for Bombardier to win orders these days.[...]. It also raises the question of how profitable the next C Series order they win will be for them."

On 17 February 2016, Air Canada signed a Letter of Intent (LOI) with Bombardier for up to 75 CS300 aircraft as part of its narrowbody fleet renewal plan. This comprised 45 firm orders, plus options for an additional 30 aircraft. It includes substitution rights to CS100 aircraft in certain circumstances, with deliveries to occur from late 2019 to 2022. The $3.8 billion order for 45 CS300 aircraft was finalized on 28 June 2016.
On 14 April, Bombardier shares were at a six-month high based on then-unconfirmed rumours that Delta Air Lines had ordered the CSeries. On 28 April, finally, Bombardier and Delta announced a sale for 75 CS100 firm orders and 50 options; the first aircraft was to enter service in spring 2018. Airways News believed that a substantial 65 to 70% discount off the $71.8 million list price was provided making the final sale at $24.6–28.7 million price per aircraft; this large order from a major carrier could help Bombardier to break the Boeing/Airbus duopoly on narrow-body aircraft.
With 127 firm orders in early 2016, introduction was to be with a firm backlog of more than 300 orders and up to 800 aircraft including options, conditional orders, LOI and purchase rights; they implied an onerous contract provision of around $500 million, which equates to $ million per order.

2017 
At the November 2017 Dubai Air Show, the state-owned flag carrier Egyptair announced a LOI for 12 CS300s and 12 options. Bombardier previously received a LOI for 31 firm orders and 30 options from an unidentified European carrier. The two orders were to be finalised by the end of 2017, but only EgyptAir signed firm order for 12 CS300s with list price of around $1.1 billion on 29 December 2017, making the total orders 372 CSeries in 2017, in addition to the 115 commitments, 90 options and 18 purchase rights already held.
On 28 May 2018, the Latvia flag carrier airBaltic announced a firm order for 30 CS300 along with 15 options and 15 purchase rights.
By 2018, the unit costs of a 100 and 300 series were US$81 m and US$91.5 m.

Airbus A220

2018 

The airliner has been marketed as A220 since its acquisition by Airbus in 2018. The small variant A220-100 (formerly CS100) competes with the Embraer E195-E2, while the longer variant A220-300 (formerly CS300) complements the Airbus A319neo in competing against the Boeing 737-700 and yet to be certified 737 MAX 7.

After the partnership took effect on 1 July 2018, the main stakeholder Airbus assisted in marketing and servicing of the aircraft. On 10 July 2018, hours after the CSeries programme was renamed A220, JetBlue Airways ordered 60 A220-300s (former CS300) to replace its 60 Embraer 190s from 2020 with 40% lower fuel burn per seat, a blow to Embraer which was marketing the E195-E2 to the carrier. Priced at $5.4 billion before customary discounts, they should be delivered from Mobile, Alabama, some could be converted to the A220-100 (former CS100) and 60 options are pending from 2025. JetBlue found the two models very close economically, as the A220-300 fuel seat cost is 40% lower than its current E190 and operating cost per seat excluding fuel are 22% lower.

Since July 2018, Airbus has promoted the A220 to airlines in Southeast Asia in particular, highlighting low operating costs for regional jet operators and low seat-mile costs for the low-cost carriers that dominate this price-sensitive market. Airbus believes that the A220 has a role to play in the rise of point-to-point traffic in the region, especially on new routes with thin initial demand.

2019 

In January 2019, confirmation of sales to JetBlue and Breeze Airways pushed the A220 order backlog to more than double that of the slightly larger A319neo. Delta Air Lines ordered 15 further A220s for a total of 90 until 2023, including a conversion of 50 to the larger 130-seat A220-300 from 2020. Airbus acknowledged that competition between the A220-300 and the A319neo was resulting in fewer A319 orders, but confirmed that the A319neo will not be discontinued. In May 2019, a Delta Enhanced Equipment Trust Certificate report indicated the A220-100 mean appraised value was $34.1 million per aircraft, but there was wide variation.

At the Paris Air Show 2019, Air Lease Corporation (ALC) signed a letter of intent for 50 A220-300s, thus becoming the first major leasing company to order the type. In July 2019, Air France–KLM announced a commitment for 60 A220-300s, plus options for a further 60 aircraft, to be delivered from September 2021 to replace Air France's A318 and A319 fleet. Air France noted its interest in converting some orders to a stretched variant of the A220. The Memorandum of Understanding (MOU) would bring the backlog to a total of 611 aircraft, although up to 110 of these are indefinitely deferred "ghost" orders recorded before the Airbus partnership.
On 14 October 2019, Air Austral, France's Réunion Island-based airline, signed a firm order for three A220-300 aircraft as part of the renewal of its Medium and Short Haul fleet. 
At the November 2019 Dubai Air Show, the flag carrier Air Senegal signed an MoU for eight A220-300s, the airline's largest order so far.
On 18 December 2019, the Air France–KLM airline holding company finally firmed up order for 60 Airbus A220s.

2020 

In January 2020, the leading lessor of regional aircraft Nordic Aviation Capital (NAC) officially finalised an order for 20 A220 aircraft. The MoU was signed in June 2019 at the Paris Air Show and it was counted in the 2019 order-book because the corresponding firm order was signed at the end of 2019. Also in January 2020, Air Senegal finalised its order for eight A220-300s, the MoU of which the airline signed in November 2019 at the Dubai Air Show.

In October 2020, Southwest Airlines, an all-Boeing carrier since establishment and the world's largest operator of the 737 family, announced that it was considering the A220 beside the yet-to-be-certified 737 MAX 7 to replace its 737-700 fleet from 2025. The speculation ended however in March 2021, when the airline announced an order for 100 Boeing 737 MAX 7 and said that negotiations with Airbus were never initiated.
In December 2020, Air France's CEO, Ben Smith, said that a stretched A220 would be ideal to replace its larger narrow-bodies, the A320 and A321, but that if it is not developed on time, the company might consider the 737 MAX.

2021

In the monthly orders and deliveries report for March 2021, Airbus announced that an undisclosed customer had ordered 20 A220-300s, bringing a total of 649 A220 aircraft to order.
Later, on 13 September 2021, Breeze Airways confirmed the order of additional 20 A220-300s, bringing its total orders up to 80 aircraft of this type, second behind Delta.
On 28 May 2021, Airbus unveiled a new A220 full-size cabin display (mockup) taken from the first Flight Test Vehicle (FTV 1) in its Airspace Customer Showroom (ACS) in Toulouse, France. The mockup will showcase potential cabin configurations, persuade prospective customers to purchase the aircraft as well as help existing customers optimise their onboard configurations.
On 21 July 2021, the third day of the Moscow International Airshow (MAKS), Russian independent carrier Azimuth Airlines signed a leasing agreement for six A220-300s with ALC. It was the first order since the aircraft secured certification from the country's federal aviation regulator Rosaviatsia. In September 2021, Airbus China entered into talks with the local Civil Aviation Administration (CAA) over the A220's certification in the country, as some airlines from the western part of the country expressed their interest for the jetliner. With a passenger seat capacity between the Comac ARJ21 regional jet and the Comac C919 narrow-body, the Airbus A220 could become an attractive option for the Chinese aviation market.

At the Dubai Air Show in November 2021, the first major air show since the COVID-19 pandemic began, ALC and Ibom Air ordered 25 and 10 A220s, respectively.
On 1 December 2021, ITA Airways, Italy's new flag carrier, firmed up an order for seven A220s, 11 A320neos and 10 A330neos, which confirmed the MOU announced in September.
On 17 December 2021, Qantas selected the A220 as well as A320neo families as the preferred airliner for the long-term renewal of its domestic narrow-body fleet. A firm commitment for 20 A220-300s with purchase right options for the smaller A220-100 to replace the Boeing 717 fleet of QantasLink is expected to be placed by the end of 2022.

2022 

After considering A220-300 as well as A320neo for its fleet expansion, the  ultra-low cost airline (ULCC) Allegiant Air ordered 737 MAX on 6 January 2022. The ULCC was concerned about the low production rates of the A220 and the uncertainty surrounding the flexibility of the aircraft family, as the stretched A220 variant or the A220-500 programme was still not officially launched.
On 10 January 2022, Airbus signed a purchase agreement with the Fort Lauderdale, Florida, based aircraft lessor Azorra Aviation for 22 A220s including twenty A220-300s and two ACJ TwoTwenty aircraft.

At the Singapore Air Show in February 2022, the full-service aircraft lessor Aviation Capital Group (ACG), wholly owned by Tokyo Century Corporation, signed a firm contract for 20 A220s on 14 February following its order for 40 A320neo family aircraft announced in December 2021. A day later, on 15 February, JetBlue signed a firm order for an additional 30 A220-300s, making the airline the largest A220 customer with 100 aircraft ordered and lifting the total  order book for the A220 family to 740.
On 19 July, at the Farnborough Air Show,  Delta firmed up orders for 12 A220-300 aircraft, bringing its total firm order for A220s to 107 aircraft, regaining its title as largest customer of the type.
On 29 November, Croatia’s flag carrier, Croatia Airlines, signed a firm order for six A220-300s. The airline plans further to lease an additional nine A220s, taking its total commitment for the type to 15 aircraft.

2023 
On 18 January 2023, Delta ordered a dozen more A220-300s, bringing the airline's total order for the A220 Family to 119 aircraft and strengthening its position as the largest A220 customer and operator.
Qantas turned purchase rights for 9 A220-300 aircraft into a firm order for delivery in financial years 2026 and 2027.

Orders and deliveries

Orders and deliveries by type
The A220 family has 785 firm orders from 30 customers, of which Delta Air Lines is the largest. A total of 251 aircraft have been delivered .

Orders and deliveries by year

<noinclude>
Note: , the backlog of 317 firm orders includes 115 firm orders with conversion rights to the other A220 aircraft model.

Orders and deliveries by customer (sortable)

Orders by date (sortable)
 EIS — Planned entry into service
 TBD — To be defined
 ? — Date not known

Commitments sortable, presorted by date
 TBD — To be defined
 
 
 

In December 2009, United Airlines expressed interest in using the CS100 and CS300 for replacing its aging 737-300 and 737-500 aircraft, however a future order is unlikely as airline has made orders for the Airbus A319-100 and the Boeing 737-800.

In March 2010, easyJet stated that the company was having "ongoing discussions with Bombardier regarding its CSeries. But the airline has since ordered the Airbus A320-200 and A320neo.

In March 2018, it was stated that Garuda Indonesia wanted to order the CS300 as a replacement for the Bombardier CRJ-1000.

Orders & deliveries graph

Orders & deliveries as of 28 February 2023

Commitments, Options & Purchase Rights Graph

See also

Airbus aircraft
List of Airbus A320 orders
List of Airbus A320neo family orders
Bombardier Aerospace aircraft
List of Bombardier CRJ operators
List of Bombardier Dash 8 operators
Similar aircraft
List of Boeing 737 MAX orders
List of Embraer E-Jet operators

Notes
The carrier, in June 2015, converted 10 of the CS100 on order to CS300 frames for delivery in 2017. 5 more CS100 aircraft were converted to CS300 in June 2016. The remaining 5 CS100 were convertible to the larger variant within the end of 2016; Swiss announced with their 2016 financial results in March 2017 that they finalized the conversion.
The firm order signed by this undisclosed airline was terminated due to financial difficulties of the customer and removed from the backlog during the first quarter of 2013.
This order was originally announced as signed by an undisclosed airline, reported as a major network carrier. It was disclosed in June 2013 that the airline was Gulf Air. It was at first announced as the first operator of the CS100 aircraft, however, Gulf Air deferred their deliveries until 2018, as part of its restructuring plan. As a result, Braathens Regional Aviation was to be the first airline to receive the CS100, but declined the role due to the program's delays.
The contract signed by this new startup airline was originally announced as firmed by an undisclosed European airline. Media sources initially reported the customer as Odyssey Airlines. Bombardier revealed the identity of this customer during the 2013 Paris Air Show (June 17–23). At the end of March 2014, Odyssey CEO revealed that the CS100 the airline has on order would be delivered during 2016.
The lessor was originally disclosed as an unnamed customer. On October 18, 2013, Bombardier announced that CDB Leasing was the company that signed this conditional order and contextually added 15 options to the previous deal.
The airline was previously identified as an undisclosed airline in the Americas.
The Government of Canada refused to open the agreement.
airBaltic signed a top up firm order at the Singapore Airshow in February 2014 and initially requested to remain unidentified. According to numbers provided by Bombardier, this order consisted of converted options. On July 14, 2014, Bombardier revealed the top up order came from airBaltic.
This order by was included in Bombardier's Q1 2014 Financial Report but not officially announced by a Press Release until the 2014 Farnborough Airshow in July.
This airline, which asked to remain unidentified at the time, is an existing Bombardier customer based in Africa.
Flightglobal reported that this top-up order came from existing customer Ilyushin Finance Co. The lessor's website also reports a total of 39 CS300 on order.
During the second quarter of 2016, following bankruptcy proceedings of Republic Airways Holdings, Bombardier removed Republic's order from its production plan, despite retaining it on the backlog.
Due to the economic situation in Russia, IFC revisited its order for 32 CS300 aircraft plus 10 option to 20 CS300 aircraft plus additional Bombardier Q400 aircraft.
On 17 June 2015 at the Paris Airshow, airBaltic confirmed it will be the launch operator of the CS300 in the fourth quarter of 2016. The airline received its first CS300 at the end of November 2016, commencing CSeries operations on the 14th December 2016.
In March 2017, Braathens Regional Aviation announced it would postpone all of its orders for the CSeries indefinitely after a new Swedish ticket tax was proposed which is expected to decrease passenger demand. Upon releasing of the second quarted financial result from Bombardier, the total order from Braathens Leasing is now consisting uniquely of CS100 aircraft, signifying a conversion by the customer completed during the quarter.
During the first quarter results conference, Bombardier announced that Ilyushin Finance had reassigned 6 of their CS300 on order to GTLK State Transport Leasing Co., to be leased to Red Wings Airlines and operated in cooperation with Nordavia.
In June 2018 several news outlets have reported that a new start-up by David Neeleman, tentatively named Moxy Airways, was to order 60 CS300 aircraft to start operations in 2020. During the 2018 Farnbourough airshow, a consortium of investors signed a commitment with Airbus, with deliveries starting in 2021, although they dismissed the usage of Moxy in the name as that would be in conflict with the samely-named Moxy Hotels by Marriott International.

References

External links

Airbus
Bombardier Aerospace

Airbus A220
220